Phoenix Central School District (Phoenix CSD) is a K–12 public school district in the Town of Schroeppel in Central New York. The district educates about 1,900 students.

Schools
John C. Birdlebough High School (9-12)
Emerson J. Dillon Middle School (5-8)
Michael A. Maroun Elementary School (K-4)

References

Education in Oswego County, New York
School districts in New York (state)